New Gottland is an unincorporated community in McPherson County, Kansas, United States.

History
A post office was opened in New Gottland in 1872, and remained in operation until it was discontinued in 1883.

Education
The community is served by McPherson USD 418 public school district.

References

Further reading

External links
 McPherson County maps: Current, Historic, KDOT

Unincorporated communities in McPherson County, Kansas
Unincorporated communities in Kansas
1872 establishments in Kansas
Populated places established in 1872